Alexander Gennadiyevich Legkov (born 7 May 1983) is a retired Russian cross-country skier who competed internationally between 2002 and 2017. He has five individual World Cup victories including one Tour de Ski title, as well as gold and silver medals at the 2014 Winter Olympics.

Biography
Legkov participated in three Winter Olympic Games (2006, 2010, 2014). Legkov finished in fourth place after a strong final push to catch then-leader Johan Olsson of Sweden at the 2010 Winter Olympics' 30 km double pursuit. Olsson finished in third place with Legkov 1.2 seconds behind. Legkov's next best result was eight in the 4 × 10 km relay at the 2010 Games in Vancouver.

In 2014 Winter Olympics in Sochi Legkov wins the gold medal in the 50 km freestyle, and the silver medal in the 4 × 10 km relay.

Legkov was second behind Germany's Tobias Angerer in the 2006–07 World Cup.

He earned a silver in the 4 × 10 km relay and finished twice in sixth place (15 km, 15 km + 15 km double pursuit) at  the FIS Nordic World Ski Championship in Sapporo in 2007.

Alexander Legkov was Total winner of Tour de Ski 2012–13 when he defeated Dario Cologna, Maxim Vylegzhanin and Petter Northug racing up Alpe Cermis on 6 January 2013.

On 6 April 2018, Legkov announced his retirement from sport during his participation at the competition "Sports Elite" in Khanty-Mansiysk.

Doping case
In December 2016, the International Ski Federation provisionally suspended six Russian cross-country skiers linked to doping violations during the 2014 Winter Olympics, including Legkov. In November 2017, Legkov was disqualified for doping offences by the International Olympic Committee, and his 2014 Olympic results were annulled. In February 2018, the international Court of Arbitration for Sport 
reinstated Legkov's results in Sochi 2014, including two medals, and annulled disqualification imposed by IOC. CAS concluded that there were no sufficient evidence that Legkov had broken anti-doping rules.

On 19 January 2019 the IOC's appeal of Legkov's case was rejected by the Swiss Federal Tribunal, which according to the Legkov's lawyer means that he had been "finally cleared of the accusation of doping at 2014".

Personal life
Legkov is a member of PutinTeam, a political organization founded in support of Vladimir Putin.

Cross-country skiing results
All results are sourced from the International Ski Federation (FIS).

Olympic Games
 2 medals – (1 gold, 1 silver)

World Championships
 2 medals – (1 silver, 1 bronze)

World Cup

Season titles
 1 title – (1 distance)

Season standings

Individual podiums
9 victories – (6 , 3 ) 
35 podiums – (22 , 13 )

Team podiums
3 victories – (3 )
12 podiums – (12 )

References

External links
 
 
 
 

1983 births
Living people
People from Moscow Oblast
Cross-country skiers at the 2006 Winter Olympics
Cross-country skiers at the 2010 Winter Olympics
Cross-country skiers at the 2014 Winter Olympics
Olympic cross-country skiers of Russia
Russian male cross-country skiers
FIS Nordic World Ski Championships medalists in cross-country skiing
Olympic gold medalists for Russia
Olympic silver medalists for Russia
Russian sportspeople in doping cases
Tour de Ski winners
Tour de Ski skiers
Sportspeople from Moscow Oblast